The 2011–12 season was MSV Duisburg's 112th season and their 4th season in the 2. Bundesliga after failing to be promoted. They reached the 2010–11 DFB-Pokal final last year.

On October 27, the club sacked coach Milan Šašić. Oliver Reck took over.

Info 

 Manager: Oliver Reck
 League: 2. Bundesliga
 Shirt sponsor: Rheinpower
 Average league attendance: 13,461
 League: 10th place
 German Cup: Eliminated in second round
 League top goal scorer: Branimir Bajić (6 goals)

Current squad 
As of 16 January 2011

Transfers

In:

Out:

League table

Results

League matches

Source: Kicker

DFB-Pokal matches

Source: Kicker

Preseason matches

Squad statistics
All competitions combined.

References

External links

German football clubs 2011–12 season
MSV Duisburg seasons